Steve Bashore is an American politician serving as a member of the Oklahoma House of Representatives from the 7th district. Elected in November 2020, he assumed office on January 11, 2021.

Education 
Bashore earned a Bachelor of Arts degree in political science from Oklahoma State University–Stillwater, a Master of Education in community college and higher education administration from the University of Central Oklahoma, a Master of Science in education and sports administration from the University of Miami, and a Master of Business Administration from Columbia Southern University.

Career 
Bashore served as the administrator of the Oklahoma State Athletic Commission from 1999 to 2004. He then joined Buffalo Run Casino & Resort in 2004, working as general manager before being promoted to director in 2020. He was elected to the Oklahoma House of Representatives in November 2020 and assumed office on January 11, 2021. He also serves as vice chair of the Revenue and Taxation Subcommittee of the House Committee on Appropriations and Budget Finance.

References 

Living people
Oklahoma State University alumni
University of Central Oklahoma alumni
University of Miami alumni
Columbia Southern University alumni
Republican Party members of the Oklahoma House of Representatives
21st-century American politicians
Year of birth missing (living people)